Caryocolum proxima is a moth of the family Gelechiidae. It is found in most of Europe. It is also known from North America.

The wingspan is 9-11.5 mm. Adults are bronzy metallic with paler metallic markings. They are on wing in August.

The larvae feed on Cerastium fontanum and Stellaria media. They mine the leaves of their host plant. The mine has the form of a short, inconspicuous corridor which is not lined with frass. The frass may be ejected out of the mine or is deposited in the mine as a broad pale orange central line. Older larvae live freely among spun leaves. Larvae can be found from April to May.

References

Moths described in 1828
proxima
Moths of Europe
Moths of North America